Momčilo Spremić (born August 29, 1937) is a Serbian historian and member of the Serbian Academy of Science and Arts. He is professor of General history of the Middle Ages at the University of Belgrade Faculty of Philosophy. Spremić specialized in the History of the Balkans, Italy and Spain in the Late Middle Ages.

Life and career 
Spremić was born in Donja Badanja village near Loznica, in what was then the Kingdom of Yugoslavia. He graduated from the University of Belgrade Faculty of Philosophy in 1961 and received his magister in 1965.

Spremić received his PhD in 1969, from Belgrade University with the thesis Dubrovnik i Aragonci 1442–1495, which was later published in 1971 in Serbian and in 1986 in Italian. He is a member of many professional societies, a member of the board of SIHMED (Société internationale des historiens de la Méditerranée) and a member of the executive board of the European Society of Culture (Société européenne de culture). The issue of Vuk Branković's treachery during the Battle of Kosovo in 1389 was the subject of a series of studies by Spremić. Despite the consensus of modern historiography in Serbia that Vuk Branković was not a traitor during the battle, Spremić emphasized that there is a possibility that Vuk really betrayed his Serbian allies. On November 5, 2009 he was elected a member of the Serbian Academy of Sciences and Arts.

Spremić received numerous awards which include: Svetosavska povelja 2009, Čuvari baštine, Zlatni ključ grada Smedereva (Golden key of city of Smederevo), Nagrada Vukove Zadužbine za nauku (Vuk's Endowment Award for Science) for his work Despot George Branković and his times, Nagrada fonda Dušana Baranina (Award of the Dušan Baranin Foundation), Order of Merit of the Italian Republic (5th Class / Knight), bestowed by the President of the Italian Republic and Oktobarska nagrada Grada Beograda (October Award of the City of Belgrade).

Selected works 
Spremić published about two hundred scientific works which include:
 Turski tributari u XIV i XV veku, 1970.
 Dubrovnik i Aragonci 1442–1495, Beograd 1971. (Dubrovnik e gli Aragonesi 1442–1495, Palermo 1986), OCLC Number: 443358657
 Despot Đurađ Branković i mačvanska banovina, Istorijski časopis 23, 1976.
 Dubrovačka trgovačka društva u despotovini Đurđa Brankovića, Zbornik Filozofskog fakulteta u Beogradu
 Gli Slavi tra le due sponde adriatiche, Annali dell Istituto italiano per gli Studi Storici 4, 1979.
 
 
 
 
 Srbija i Venecija (VI-XVI vek), 2014.

References

External links 
 Biography on the website of SANU
 Review of the book "Деспот Ђурађ Бранковић и његово доба"

1937 births
People from Loznica
20th-century Serbian historians
Members of the Serbian Academy of Sciences and Arts
Academic staff of the University of Belgrade
University of Belgrade Faculty of Philosophy alumni
Living people
21st-century Serbian historians